Thomas Joseph Hannon (December 9, 1900 – June 27, 1983) was an American politician who served as a member of the Massachusetts House of Representatives from 1935 to 1941 and from 1955 to 1957 and the Boston City Council from 1942 to 1952.

Early life
Hannon was born on December 9, 1900, in Boston. He grew up in the Uphams Corner neighborhood of Dorchester. As a young man, Hannon worked as a longshoreman and for the Boston Department of Public Works to help support his family. He graduated from The English High School and studied at the Oblate Seminary in Tewksbury, Massachusetts. He decided to pursue a legal career rather than the priesthood and graduated from Canisius College, Catholic University, and the Northeastern University School of Law. He was admitted to the bar in 1928 and started a practice with his brother Edwin F. Hannon.

Political career
Hannon was elected to the Massachusetts House of Representatives in 1934. In 1938 he was a candidate for Democratic floor leader. He lost to John F. Aspell 64 votes to 24 (a third candidate, John P. White, received 2 votes). In 1940, Hannon ran for the 4th Suffolk District seat in the Massachusetts Senate, but lost to fellow representative Leo J. Sullivan by 83 votes.

In 1941, Hannon was elected to represent Ward 13 on the Boston City Council. In 1943 he succeeded in having a playground in his neighborhood named after his mother, Mary A. Hannon. He served as Council president in 1943 and 1948. During his second term as president Hannon implemented new rules to speed up council business and increase decorum. In 1951, the Boston City Council switched from a body consisting of 22 ward members to a nine-member board elected at-large. He finished 19th in the 65-candidate preliminary election, which kept him off the general election ballot. Hannon ran again in 1953 and finished 15th in the general election.

In 1955, Hannon returned to the Massachusetts House of Representatives. In 1956 lost his bid for renomination to future Speaker of the Massachusetts House of Representatives and Massachusetts Attorney General Robert H. Quinn by 17 votes.

Later life
Hannon continued to practice law until his retirement in 1978. He spent his later years in Hyannis, Massachusetts. He died on June 27, 1983 at Cape Cod Hospital.

See also
 1935-1936 Massachusetts legislature
 1937-1938 Massachusetts legislature
 1939 Massachusetts legislature
 1955-1956 Massachusetts legislature
 Massachusetts House of Representatives' 12th Suffolk district
 Massachusetts House of Representatives' 13th Suffolk district

References

1900 births
1983 deaths
Boston City Council members
Canisius College alumni
Catholic University of America alumni
Northeastern University School of Law alumni
Lawyers from Boston
Democratic Party members of the Massachusetts House of Representatives
People from Dorchester, Massachusetts
People from Hyannis, Massachusetts
20th-century American lawyers
20th-century American politicians